Wyrms  is a six-issue comic book mini-series by Orson Scott Card and Jake Black, based on the novel Wyrms by author Orson Scott Card. Publication started in April 2006 by Dabel Brothers Productions and was finished in February 2008 by Marvel Comics.

Collections

The series has been collected into a trade paperback.

See also
List of works by Orson Scott Card
Orson Scott Card

References

External links
 The official Orson Scott Card website

2006 comics debuts
Books by Orson Scott Card
Marvel Comics limited series
Comics based on fiction